Athletes from the Federal People's Republic of Yugoslavia competed at the 1956 Winter Olympics in Cortina d'Ampezzo, Italy.

Alpine skiing

Men

Women

Cross-country skiing

Men

Men's 4 × 10 km relay

Women

Women's 3 x 5 km relay

Ski jumping

References
Official Olympic Reports
International Olympic Committee results database
 Olympic Winter Games 1956, full results by sports-reference.com

Nations at the 1956 Winter Olympics
1956
Winter Olympics